Sniffles and the Bookworm is a 1939 Warner Bros. Merrie Melodies cartoon directed by Chuck Jones. The short was released on December 2, 1939, and stars Sniffles the mouse.

This is the third cartoon with Sniffles, although the plot is more in line with the "books come to life" entries from around this period.

Plot 
Mother Goose characters come to life late at night in a bookshop, serenading Sniffles the mouse, and his bookworm friend (in his first appearance) with the swing song "Mutiny in the Nursery" by Johnny Mercer and Harry Warren, until the Frankenstein monster intrudes.

References

External links 

1939 films
1939 animated films
Short films directed by Chuck Jones
Merrie Melodies short films
Warner Bros. Cartoons animated short films
Animated films about animals
Animated films about mice
Animated films about insects
1930s Warner Bros. animated short films
Frankenstein films